Christopher Robert Abel (28 April 1912 – 15 September 1986) was a footballer who played in the Football League for Bradford City and Leeds United. He was born in Gorton, Manchester, England.

References

1912 births
1986 deaths
English footballers
Bradford City A.F.C. players
Leeds United F.C. players
Stalybridge Celtic F.C. players
English Football League players
Association football defenders